Félix Sabal Lecco is a drummer from Cameroon.

Early life
Sabal Lecco comes from a diplomatic family.
His father, also Félix Sabal Lecco, was a minister in the government of Ahmadou Ahidjo, and was later appointed ambassador to Italy and France.

Career
Sabal Lecco has played with world-famous musicians such as Jeff Beck, Prince, Peter Gabriel, Herbie Hancock, Snoop Dogg, Janet Jackson, Lenny Kravitz, Shawn Lane, Jonas Hellborg, with African artists such as Youssou Ndour, Salif Keita and Manu Dibango, with the Celtic musician Alan Stivell, to name a few.
He features as a drummer on The Rhythm of the Saints, the eighth studio album of Paul Simon, released in 1990. His brother, Armand Sabal-Lecco, plays bass on this album.

A renowned drummer, Félix Sabal Lecco has taught at the Conservatoire d'Amiens.
He has also tried a career in acting, with Tismée by Bruno Fougnies.

Discography
Albums on which Félix Sabal Lecco has performed include:

Filmography

Sabal Lecco's music has been featured on several documentaries:
2004 The Enigma of the Black Caiman (TV documentary)
2006 Au commencement était la vase (TV documentary)
2007 Voyage en eau trouble (documentary)
2007 Nyaman' gouacou (Viande de ta mère) (short)

References

Living people
Cameroonian musicians
Jazz drummers
Year of birth missing (living people)